The 2016–17 Elite Ice Hockey League season was the 14th season of the Elite Ice Hockey League. The regular season begun in early September and ended in March. Regular season champion Cardiff Devils were defeated in the playoff final by their Erhardt Conference rivals Sheffield Steelers 6–5 in double-overtime.

From the 2016–17 season, the number of non British-trained players rose from 13 to 14, while the number of work-permit players remained at 11, according to 
a rule change first introduced in 2014.

Teams

Erhardt Conference

Gardiner Conference

Standings

Overall
All games counted towards the overall Elite League standings. Each team played 52 matches; 32 matches against their four Conference rivals, and 20 against the five teams from the other Conference. The Cardiff Devils became regular season champions for the first time in twenty years, with a 6–2 win over the Sheffield Steelers on 18 March 2017 at Ice Arena Wales.

Erhardt Conference
Only intra-conference games counted towards the Erhardt Conference standings. Each team played the other four teams in the Conference eight times, for a total of 32 matches. The Cardiff Devils won the Conference for the second successive season, with a 4–3 win over the Belfast Giants on 25 March 2017 at Ice Arena Wales.

Gardiner Conference
Only intra-conference games counted towards the Gardiner Conference standings. Each team played the other four teams in the Conference eight times, for a total of 32 matches. The Braehead Clan won the Conference for the third successive season, with a 4–1 win over the Dundee Stars on 25 February 2017 at the Braehead Arena.

Playoffs

Bracket

Quarter-finals

(E1) Cardiff Devils vs. (RS8) Manchester Storm

(G1) Braehead Clan vs. (RS7) Dundee Stars

(RS3) Sheffield Steelers vs. (RS4) Nottingham Panthers

(RS2) Belfast Giants vs. (RS6) Fife Flyers

Semi-finals

Third-place match

Grand Final

Challenge Cup

The Challenge Cup was won by the Cardiff Devils, who came from behind to beat the Sheffield Steelers 3-2.

The win meant Cardiff had won the Challenge Cup twice in the previous three years, with their other victory coming in 2014-15, also against the Steelers.

Statistics

Scoring leaders
The following players led the league in points at the conclusion of the regular season.

Leading goaltenders
The following goaltenders led the league in goals against average, playing at least 2100 minutes, at the conclusion of the regular season.

References

Elite Ice Hockey League seasons
1
United